Rent control in Scotland is based upon the statutory codes relating to private sector residential tenancies.  Although not strictly within the private sector, tenancies granted by housing associations, etc., are dealt with as far as is appropriate in this context. Controlling prices, along with security of tenure and oversight by an independent regulator or the courts, is a part of rent regulation.

Regarding Rent Act 1977 legislation, when the legislation deals solely with the law applicable to private sector residential tenancies, the Act usually covers, mutatis mutantis, both Scotland and England and Wales; but when the legislation also covers other matters, it is more customary for separate parallel Acts to be promoted. Examples of the first category are all the pre-1939 war Acts and the Rent Acts of 1957, 1965 and 1974; and of the second, the Housing Act 1980, in Scotland this is the Tenant's Rights Etc. (Scotland) Act 1980; and the Housing Act 1988, in Scotland this is the Housing (Scotland) Act 1988.

Relevant legislation

Legislation inapplicable to Scotland
Rent control in England and Wales contains references to legislation applicable only to England and Wales and for which there is no direct or comparable Scottish equivalent. The reasons for this are various and include

a) implementation of an election manifesto commitment in relation to south of the border;
b) introduction of a new form of tenure on an experimental basis;
c) different conditions in Scotland; and
d) the fundamental differences in the systems of land tenure between Scotland and England   and Wales.

It is not necessary in the context of this note to attempt to identify all of the legislation referred to in the previous paragraph and accordingly only the more important Acts and Orders, important (generally but not always) in a policy sense, are listed.

Landlord and Tenant Act 1954
Leasehold Reform Act 1967
Rent (Agriculture) Act 1976
Protected Shorthold Tenancies (Rent Registration) Order 1981
Landlord and Tenant Act 1985
Housing and Planning Act 1986
Landlord and Tenant Act 1987
Rent (Relief from Phasing) Order 1987
Local Government and Housing Act 1989
Leasehold Reform, Housing and Urban Development Act 1993

Legislation which is applicable to Scotland
It may be useful at this point to refer to two other more general matters - the Leases Act 1449 and tacit relocation.

The Leases Act 1449
In the centuries since 1449 the law south of the border has certainly gone beyond Scots law in the statutory regulation of leases; but Scotland must surely have been the first to confer rights beyond those conferred by the contract of tenancy itself, which prior to 1449 would have been binding only on the parties to it. But the effect of the 1449 Act (which is still on the statute book and which by modern standards is admirably concise, running only to some six lines) is that, where ownership of a property subject to an existing tenancy changes hands, the new owner is bound by the lease and must allow the tenant not only to remain in possession but to do so at the original rent. Thanks to the Act, the tenant has obtained, not only a personal right enforceable against the original landlord, but a real right enforceable against the landlord's singular successor.

"Singular successor" means someone who became the owner of heritable property by any means other than by inheritance, the most obvious being through purchase.

Tacit Relocation
Under Scots law, one of the essential elements of a lease is the need to state the period of the lease, i.e. have a starting and finishing date. The expiry date in Scotland is known as the "ish". Thus Scottish leases are equivalent to a fixed term lease south of the border. However, in Scotland a lease does not automatically come to an end when the ish is reached. If neither party takes steps by sending the other a notice to quit to terminate the lease at the ish they are presumed to have wanted the lease to continue. This presumption is known as "tacit relocation" (silent renewal).

The principle of tacit relocation can continue a lease indefinitely on the same terms as originally agreed, except as to duration. If the lease was initially for a year or less, continuation for the same period is inferred; if for more than a year, continuation for a year. If either landlord or tenant wants to end his lease at the expiry of the extended period a valid notice to quit has to be served, otherwise a further extension of the same length will take place. And so on, ad infinitum.

Tacit relocation has important consequences for both parties. It begins to operate as soon as the date by which notice to quit should have been given has passed. Thus the landlord of a dwelling-house let under a contractual tenancy cannot increase the rent until the end of the extended lease (and then only if he takes the appropriate action timeously); and the tenant for his part cannot resile from his obligations under the extended lease, whether he continues in possession or not.

Controlled tenancies in Scotland
As already indicated, prior to the Acts of 1954 practically all of the earlier Acts were of common application, the exceptions being the Rent of Furnished Houses Control (Scotland) Act 1943 and the Furnished Houses (Rent Control) Act 1946. Reference should accordingly be made to The History of Rent control in England and Wales to ascertain:-

a) which dwelling-houses were within the Acts at any particular time;
b) how the standard rent (which was the foundation payment) was determined; and
c) the specified increases that could be added to it.

However, mention should perhaps be made of the way in which rates were treated differently north and south of the border. In Scotland the position was that local rates were paid partly by owners and partly by occupiers (in contrast to England where the local rates were always paid by the occupier). The main exception to the above general rule was that the landlord of a "small dwelling-house" as defined by the House Letting and Rating (Scotland) Acts 1911 and 1920, was responsible for payment of the occupier's rates on the house but he could recover the full amount of these from the tenant by means of an addition to the rent.

The Act of 1920 permitted landlords to increase rents by 40 per cent (25 per cent of which was in respect of the increased cost of repairs). In addition, landlords in Scotland were empowered to recover by way of an addition to the rent, all increases in owner's rates between 1914 and 1920. But thereafter the position was that out of the increase of 40 per cent permitted in 1920, the landlord in Scotland had to pay all increases in owner's rates from 1920 onwards, until 1957 when owner's rates were abolished. (In contrast the landlord of a controlled house south of the border who charged the permitted increase of 40 per cent benefited from the whole of that increase).

The result of this requirement from the point of view of rented property maintenance was disastrous because the bulk of the money which should have been spent on repairs had to be used instead to pay the owner's rates. This is the short explanation of why so much deterioration of rented property took place throughout Scotland.

The Housing (Repairs and Rents) (Scotland) Act 1954 attached qualifying conditions similar to those applied by the English Act of 1954 to the "repairs increase" which it permitted. But it used a different formula, based on the rent recoverable immediately before 30 August 1954. An increase of 40 per cent in that rent was allowed where the landlord spent at least 60 per cent of the rent on repairs in the 12 months immediately preceding the notice of increase.

As far as Scotland was concerned the Act of 1954 was a complete failure. Out of the 700,000 controlled tenancies that there then were the rent was increased in only 3 per cent of them. The condition of the remaining 97 per cent simply went from bad to worse.

The Scottish Act of 1954 added the Scottish Special Housing Association to the list of public bodies whose tenancies were decontrolled.

Passed only after several pea-souper fogs called "smog" in the capitals and industrial towns had caused health problems, the Clean Air Act 1956 (which applied south and north of the border) reimbursed expenditure spent on the adaptation of fireplaces to burn smokeless fuel. The work counted as an improvement for rent increase purposes under the Rent Act 1957. Eight per cent of the cost (net of any reimbursement) could be added to the rent.

The Rent Act 1957 was the first really important post war step towards general decontrol and reference should be made to the History of rent control in England and Wales for the decontrolling provisions applicable to Scotland. No further general decontrol took place until 1973.

The provisions of the Act of 1957 for increasing rents in Scotland, unlike those applicable to England and Wales, did not have the merit of simplicity; and were further complicated by reference back to entitlement to the repairs increase under the Act of 1954. In summary, the Act provided that:-
1.  the repairs increase under the Act of 1954 was raised to 50 per cent of the pre-1954 recoverable rent, either by the addition of a further 10 percent to top up the 40 per cent already added, or the full 50 percent in cases where the repairs increase was first obtained after 5 July 1957.
2.  alternatively an increase of 25 per cent of the pre-1954 recoverable rent without proof that repairs had been carried out. This could be increased to 50 per cent when the "expenditure on repairs" test under the Act of 1954 was subsequently met. The 25 per cent was adjustable if the landlord was not wholly responsible for repairs.

The Housing (Scotland) Act 1969 repeated, for Scotland, the "qualification certificate" procedure embodied in the Housing Act 1969 for converting the better houses subject to controlled tenancies to rent regulation. Conversion was to be effected in three stages of six months, commencing on 1 January 1971, with the larger houses being converted first.

The Fire Precautions Act 1971 provided that any expenditure incurred by the landlord in respect of alterations to comply with notices under that Act was to be treated as expenditure incurred on "improvements" for the purposes of increasing the rent.
       
The Housing (Financial Provisions) (Scotland) Act 1972 carried the 1969 conversion process a stage further by providing for the automatic conversion of controlled tenancies to regulated tenancies in three annual stages, according to the dwelling's rateable value, the first stage commencing on 1 January 1973 with the conversion of the larger houses. Unfit houses were excluded. The "qualification certificate" procedure still remained available (but was seldom used).

"Standstills" imposed under counter-inflation measures had postponed until 31 December 1975 the automatic conversion of the final stage due to commence on 1 January 1975 and this postponement was made permanent by the Housing, Rents and Subsidies (Scotland) Act 1975.

That Act did, however, permit a repairs increase of 12 1/2 per cent, based this time on the cost of the repairs, in the rent. Until this repairs increase was introduced, at no time had the landlord been able to increase the rent by more than one-half of the rent which was recoverable in August 1954, even if extensive repairs had been carried out.

The Tenant's Rights Etc., (Scotland) Act 1980 converted, by means of a commencement Order, all remaining controlled tenancies to regulated tenancies on 1 December 1980.

Regulated tenancies in Scotland
As has already been indicated, the Rent Act 1965 applied rent regulation to tenancies in Scotland with a rateable value not exceeding £200 and which were not controlled tenancies. (This upper limit was not affected by the Counter Inflation Act 1973 which raised, but only for England and Wales, the rateable value limits for tenancies to be within the Rent Acts). Following rating re-valuations in Scotland in 1978 and 1985, the rateable value limits were increased to £600 from 1 April 1978, and to £1,600 from 1 April 1985, in respect of dwellings which were first entered in the Valuation Roll on or after those dates. (Note: "Valuation Roll" is the same as the English "Valuation List").

The main differences between Scotland and south of the border occur in the administration of the "fair rents" system, the formula by which fair rents are to be assessed, the retention of a three-year registration period and the continued phasing of rent increases.

Rent Registration Service
In Scotland, Rent Officers are appointed directly by the Secretary of State for Scotland and during the first decade or so of rent regulation were recruited externally to serve purely as Rent Officers. For administrative purposes they were on the staff of the then Scottish Development Department, now the Scottish Office Environment Department. Following assimilation of the externally recruited serving Rent Officers in the mid 1970s into the analogous Civil Service grade, external recruitment was halted and subsequent vacancies occurring in the Service were filled by postings of suitable Higher Executive Officers (since 1994 Executive Officers) from within Scottish Office personnel, with the posted officers able to return to normal departmental duties in due course.

Rent Officers in Scotland have, ever since the inception of the Service, mainly operated in groups based in Aberdeen, Dundee, Edinburgh and Glasgow (in the early days there were some part-time Rent Officers scattered throughout Scotland). They were appointed to serve in any of the registration areas covered from those cities. Their appointments were subsequently extended to any registration area in Scotland. Appointments on this basis gave the Service an organisational flexibility that only arrived south of the border through the amendments made by the Housing Act 1988 to the arrangements there for administering the system of rent regulation.

The background to the administrative arrangements being different north and south of the border is that it is understood that in the preliminary discussions with the local authorities in Scotland about the way in which a system of local Rent Officers was to be established, the local authorities were, in general, not in favour of being associated with a Service which would increase rents. Accordingly, Rent Officers in Scotland had perforce to be employed by the Secretary of State, via the Scottish Office

Housing and Property Chamber
The Housing and Property Chamber of the First-tier Tribunal hears appeals against a determination by a Rent Officer, applications for rent determinations for tenancies that are Assured or Short Assured, and to consider if a private landlord has met repair standards. The House and Property Chamber assumed the functions of the previous Private Rented Housing Panel (prhp).

The Housing and Property Chamber was established by the Scottish Ministers by Scottish Statutory Instrument that came into force on 1 December 2016, and the appointment of members is further regulated by Scottish Statutory Instrument. The power to transfer tribunal powers was established by the Tribunals (Scotland) Act 2014. Appointments to the Housing and Property Chamber (including the President and Deputy President) are made by the Scottish Ministers, on the recommendation of the Judicial Appointments Board for Scotland.

Fair rent procedure generally

Rent Includes Payment For Services
As Scotland has very few serviced flats in the true private sector, i.e. excluding housing association sheltered housing complexes or "staircasing" arrangements, it was not considered necessary to require landlords in Scotland to support an application for fair rent which will include an amount payable for services with details of the relevant expenditure. (But in practice, all affected landlords generally do). Thus section 46 of the Rent (Scotland) Act 1984 contains no subsection equivalent to subsection 2(b) of section 67 of the Rent Act 1977.

Local Authority Applications
Local authorities in Scotland never have had a right (as they once had in England and Wales) to make independent application to the Rent Officer to have a fair rent determined and registered.

Certificate Of Fair Rent
In Scotland, the certificate of fair rent procedure was not repealed in 1988 and accordingly still remains available to landlords who wish to know in advance what the fair rent would be. Its use has now been much curtailed but it could still be used by a housing association who intended to transfer a secure tenant to another house, or by a landlord who was contemplating improvement works to a house subject to a regulated tenancy.

Short Tenancies
This is the Scottish equivalent to protected shorthold tenancies, which were introduced in 1980 by the Housing Act 1980 for England and Wales, the Scottish Act being Tenant's Rights Etc., (Scotland) Act 1980 for Scotland.

Short tenancies guaranteed landlords a right of recovery of possession provided the procedural requirements were met, i.e. let at a fair rent from one to five years to a new tenant who had received prior warning that the tenancy on offer was on a short tenancy basis.

Retention Of The Three Year Registration Period
The reason why Scotland retained a three-year registration period in 1980, when a reduction to two years was one of the amendments made to the "fair rents" procedure by the Housing Act 1980, was the pressure on Scottish Office staffing levels at that time. As the Rent Registration Service was staffed by civil servants it had to play its full part in helping to keep Scottish Office staff complement within the overall ceiling. Accordingly, no scope was seen for an amendment to the rent registration procedure which would result in increasing the workload by a third, particularly as the registration procedure in Scotland was not being streamlined as was taking place south of the border to enable Rent Officers there to cope with the increased workload.

The Statutory Formula
The basic statutory formula for assessing what is a "fair rent" is too well known to need or bear repeating (but see The Development of Rent Control England and Wales) . However, mention should be made of two amendments to it which were not of common application.

England and Wales Amendment

The Housing, Rents and Subsidies Act 1975 required new or removed, or improved or deteriorated amenities provided in the locality by persons other than the landlord to be disregarded. This requirement was subsequently repealed in 1980.

Scotland Amendment

The Tenant's Rights, Etc., (Scotland) Act 1980 made an important change to the statutory formula to be applied in Scotland. The original concept had been left deliberately vague in 1965 but this had led to considerable judicial interpretation, particularly south of the border. Unfortunately the Court of Session in Scotland, in the cases coming before it, adopted a markedly different approach to that which had commended itself to the courts in England.

There the courts had consistently taken the view that Rent Assessment Committees (and therefore Rent Officers also) were entitled to prefer their own knowledge and experience of rent levels in the area to any expert evidence tendered to it. The Court of Session, on the other hand, required Committees to show what reasons they had, in the light of the evidence, for reaching their decision. As it was only the landlord who was likely to lead the substantive evidence, Rent Assessment Committees in Scotland had increasingly to reach their decisions on the basis of the landlord's evidence and nothing else.

The Act of 1980 therefore amended the statutory formula to include a specific requirement that Rent Officers and Rent Assessment Committees should "apply their knowledge and experience of current rents of comparable property in the area" which they could prefer to the evidence led, in determining what rent would be a fair rent for the particular dwelling-house. This express obligation thus restored to Rent Officers and Rent Assessment Committees the discretion which the Court of Session had removed.

Phasing Of Rent Increases
Machinery for restricting increases in rent has existed in various forms and for different purposes ever since the Prices and Incomes Act 1969; and Scotland is now alone in continuing to provide a measure of protection to sitting regulated tenants and housing association secure tenants against too steep an increase in rent following registration or re-registration of a fair rent. The phasing rules outlined below apply to both regulated and housing association secure tenants.

The actual phasing rules both north and south of the border were similar until 1972 when the first significant divergence occurred. For the phasing of rent increases by virtue of the decontrolling provisions of the Housing (Financial Provisions) (Scotland) Act 1972, Scotland retained the existing and well-understood format of the phasing provisions of the Rent (Scotland) Act 1971, originally enacted in the Housing (Scotland) Act 1969, the only major change being the reduction of the phasing period from four years to two years. In England and Wales, however, there was a complete departure from precedent, with the Housing Finance Act 1972 providing, via eight separate Cases, for a variety of circumstances in which phasing applied.

1975 saw the phasing rules continuing to differ. The Housing, Rents and Subsidies (Scotland) Act 1975 repealed the phasing provisions in the Acts of 1971 and 1972 and again opted for a variant of their format but with minimum and maximum annual rent increases. The same maximum annual limit was also applied to rent agreements. (The main reason for these maxima (of £78 per annum) was that the thaw on rent increases from May 1975 following the counter-inflationary "freeze" of fourteen months on rents was thought likely to cause particular problems in Scotland and a ceiling on rent increases was seen as the best way of dealing with the slush).

The Housing, Rents and Subsidies Act 1975 opted for an algebraic formula, with a minimum but no maximum annual increase. Under both regimes any "service element" was excluded from phasing. A further change introduced by both Acts of 1975 was that the phasing system was now applied to all rent increases following registration or re-registration of a fair rent.

1980 saw even greater disparity, due mainly to the new difference in the length of the registration period, with Scotland on this occasion opting for alternative increases and England and Wales having a rent increase in year 1 of the "service element" plus 50 per cent rent of the remainder of the difference between the new and the old rents, and the full registered rent being recovered a year later. The alternative increases were the greater of

a)  £104 or
b)  one quarter of the previous rent limit.

In either case the "noted amount" i.e. the "service element" was excluded.

The phasing rules were again amended by Order on 5 February 1989 and the current rules for Scotland are that, following registration of a higher fair rent, the existing rent may be increased at each annual stage up to the new registered rent by either:-

a)  £104 or
b)  one quarter of the previous rent limit; or
c)  one half of the total increase required to take the rent up to the new registered rent, whichever is the greater.

Service costs are recoverable in full in addition to the phased increases.
The current statutory references for regulated tenancies are:

Section 33 of the Rent (Scotland) Act 1984
The Limits on Rent Increases (Scotland) Order 1989

and for housing association secure tenancies are:

Section 58 of the Rent (Scotland) Act 1984
The Limits on Rent Increases (Housing Associations) (Scotland) Act 1989

Section 41 of the Housing (Scotland) Act 1988 enables the above sections 33 and 58 to be repealed or amended by Order, and makes minor amendments to both. A further amendment to Section 58 is made by Schedule 11 to the Local Government and Housing Act 1989

Housing association tenancies
Prior to 1954 housing association tenancies were subject to the Rent Acts but were in general excluded from their scope thereafter by the Housing (Repairs and Rents) (Scotland) Act 1954. Housing associations were funded through subsidies received under authorised arrangements with local authorities. But these subsidies, like those paid to local authorities, were progressively withdrawn under new funding arrangements introduced (for Scotland) by the Housing (Financial Provisions) (Scotland) Act 1972. Part of the new financial regime involved extension of the "fair rents" regime to housing association tenancies together with a modified phasing procedure.

The Housing Act 1974 revised the funding arrangements yet again. Fair rents and phasing were left unchanged but only housing associations registered with the Housing Corporation were eligible for grants and loans.

The Housing, Rents and Subsidies (Scotland) Act 1975 removed the restrictions on the payment of housing association and revenue deficit grants to fully mutual co-operative housing associations, an unintended effect of the definition used in the Housing Act 1974 to exclude certain housing associations from eligibility.

The Housing (Financial Provisions) (Scotland) Act 1978 amended the provisions in the Act of 1972 governing the phasing arrangements applicable to housing association tenancies so as to enable the annual limit on rent increases to be varied by Order. The amendment was first used in 1980 with the intention of applying to housing association rents the new phasing rules then introduced for private sector tenancies. However, due to a drafting error in the 1980 Order full parity was not achieved until 1984 by means of an Amendment Order. A further Order which came into force on 5 February 1990 continued that parity.

The Tenant's Rights, Etc., (Scotland) Act 1980 included most housing association tenancies within the new "secure tenancy" form of tenure introduced by that Act, the two exclusions being co-ownership and fully mutual co-operative housing associations registered with the Housing Corporation.

Under the provisions of the Housing (Scotland) Act 1988 a new enabling body for housing, Scottish Homes, was created. Scottish Homes took over the functions of the Housing Corporation in Scotland of supporting and monitoring housing associations. It also became a landlord by taking on the housing stock of the Scottish Special Housing Association following the Association's dissolution on 1 April 1989 by Order made under the Act of 1988.

Shared ownership agreements were also excluded by the Act of 1988 from being either regulated tenancies or assured tenancies.

Following consolidation, the current statutory provisions relating to housing association tenancies are, for secure tenancies (general and rents): Part III of the Housing (Scotland) Act 1987, Part VI of the Rent (Scotland) Act 1984 and for assured tenancies (general and rents): Part II of the Housing (Scotland) Act 1988

Assured tenancies
Assured tenancies as a form of tenure did not feature in Scotland until 2 January 1989 when they were introduced by Part II of the Housing (Scotland) Act 1988. When the concept was being considered in the late 1970s (and subsequently implemented on, it is understood, an experimental basis for England and Wales by the Housing Act 1980) no particular advantage was seen at that stage in making this new form of tenure available in Scotland on a similar basis.

The main significant difference between the style of assured tenancies introduced by the Housing Act 1988 and by the Housing (Scotland) Act 1988 is in the statutory provisions relating to increases of rent. As originally enacted, section 24 (5) of the Scottish Act of 1988 enabled landlords under assured tenancies to avoid Rent Assessment Committees having a role, by providing in the lease itself for a rent increase, either by a specified sum or by a percentage of the rent. There is no equivalent provision in the Housing Act 1988.

Schedule 11 to the Local Government and Housing Act 1989 made section 24(5) less of a "blank cheque" for landlords by amending both sections 16 and 24 of the Act of 1988. The amendments added to both sections a requirement that any factors to be used to calculate an increase in rent should not be wholly within the landlord's control; and should be such as would enable the tenant without undue difficulty to calculate what the increase in rent would be.

Furnished lettings
Furnished lettings were excluded from the Rent Acts until 1943 when under the Rent of Furnished Houses Control (Scotland) Act 1943 a system of control, administered by Rent Tribunals, was set up for the first time in Great Britain. The 1943 Act was a temporary Act intended to be in force until six months after the cessation of the Emergency Powers (Defence) Act 1939 but was subsequently extended by successive annual Expiring Laws Continuance Acts.

Rent Tribunals were initially empowered to fix reasonable rents for houses or rooms let furnished or with services, but in 1949 their powers were considerably enlarged by the Landlord and Tenant (Rent Control) Act 1949 . Both these Acts were repealed and consolidated by Part VII of the Rent (Scotland) Act 1971.

The distinction between furnished and unfurnished lettings was, for most practical purposes, abolished by the Rent Act 1974. Where the landlord lived replaced the provision of furniture and/or services as the test of Rent Tribunal jurisdiction. The law governing lettings by resident landlords, the principal element constituting a letting subject to "Rent Tribunal" jurisdiction, is now consolidated in Part VII of the Rent (Scotland) Act 1984.

Rent Tribunals as such were abolished by the Tenant's Rights Etc.,(Scotland) Act 1980 and their functions were transferred to Rent Assessment Committees.

Lettings and other contracts subject to Part VII of the Act of 1984 will gradually disappear under transitional provisions in the Housing (Scotland) Act 1988 which phase out the application of the above Act. The Act also removed the power which local authorities had had ever since the Act of 1943 to refer furnished lettings to a Rent Assessment Committee.

Business tenancies
As indicated in the introduction, Scotland lags far behind England and Wales in the statutory regulation of leases. This is particularly true of business leases, which in Scotland are commonly split into "commercial" leases, i.e. leases of shops or offices, and "industrial" leases, i.e. leases of factories.

The absence of statutory control of commercial and industrial leases in Scotland is subject to one minor exception in the form of the Tenancy of Shops (Scotland) Acts 1949 which give limited rights of security of tenure to shop tenants. The original Tenancy of Shops (Scotland) Act was enacted in 1949 as a temporary measure but after a number of yearly extensions, it was made permanent in 1964 by an Act of the same name.

A shop is defined for the purpose of the Acts as "any premises where any retail trade or business is carried on", per the Shops Act 1950.

It will be seen from the foregoing that the above Acts fall very far short of the comprehensive provisions of the Landlord and Tenant Act 1954 which in any event covers both leases of offices and factories as well as of shops.

Local authority tenancies

Rents
The need for a note on local authority rents in Scotland arises because of the reference made in the previous section to the (short-lived) reforms made in this area by the Housing Finance Act 1972 and repealed by the Housing, Rents and Subsidies Act 1975.

In the early 1970s the Government of the day wanted to move away from the then prevailing system of large indiscriminate Government subsidies towards houses provided by local authorities. The above Act of 1972 therefore required local authorities in England and Wales to charge fair rents for houses on the Housing Revenue Account; and rent scrutiny boards were created to oversee these arrangements.

However, arrangements of this kind were not considered appropriate for Scotland because of its long history of artificially low rents in the public sector. Accordingly, the Housing (Financial Provisions) (Scotland) Act 1972 provided that local authority rents in Scotland were to be increased over a transitional period by a series of reasonable annual increments. These increases plus new subsidy arrangements were designed to bring Housing Revenue Accounts into balance by the end of the transitional period, expected to be the end of either the financial year 1975-76 or 1976-77 in the majority of cases. Consideration was to be given, not later than 1975-76, to the possibility of moving to a "fair rents" basis for local authority houses.

Rent fixing arrangements similar to those introduced for local authorities were applied to New Towns and to the Scottish Special Housing Association.

These new arrangements were repealed, for England and Wales by the Housing, Rents and Subsidies Act 1975, and for Scotland by the Housing, Rents and Subsidies (Scotland) Act 1975. Both these Acts restored to local authorities the right to fix the rents for their houses themselves. The Scottish Act of 1975 made this restored freedom subject to a restriction of £39 on the amount by which rents of individual unimproved houses could be increased to sitting tenants in any period of twelve months. The restriction which was subsequently removed by the Housing (Financial Provisions) (Scotland) Act 1978 was also applied to houses owned by new towns and the Scottish Special Housing Association.

The provisions of the Scottish Act of 1975 were repealed and re-enacted in Part XI of the Housing (Scotland) Act 1987.

Long tenancies
Long tenancies (or leases) of residential property have, for a number of historical reasons beyond the scope of this note, always been comparatively rare in Scotland. (This is in marked contrast to the position in England and Wales where long leases of residential property are a common alternative to freehold ownership). Nor is it within the scope of this note to trace the evolution of the law as it now applies to long tenancies south of the border.

The comparative rarity of long residential leases in Scotland was made rarer by the Long Leases (Scotland) Act 1954. Under its provisions long leases of dwelling-houses, granted prior to 10 August 1914 for a period of at least fifty years, could be converted into feus by the tenant serving notice on the landlord. As the notice had to be served within five years of the Act of 1954coming into force (i.e. before 1 September 1959) this provision is now spent. But while it was in force the number of tenants taking up the option had the effect of making long residential leases even less common than they were before.

So far as Scotland is concerned the current statutory position is that the Land Tenure Reform (Scotland) Act 1974 prohibits the creation of a lease of a dwelling-house for a period in excess of twenty years.

There still exist some long residential leases that were created prior to 1974 and their validity is not affected by the 1974 Act. Some of them may have contained a requirement that the landlord, when the lease expired, should grant a renewal of the lease for a period in excess of twenty years. The uncertainty surrounding the grant of such a renewal in light of the 1974 Act was removed by the Law Reform (Miscellaneous Provisions) (Scotland) Act 1985 which made it clear that such a renewal was competent.

Landlord's repairing obligations
At common law the landlord of a dwelling-house in Scotland is bound, unless it is otherwise stipulated, to provide it at the commencement of the lease in a tenantable and habitable condition and thereafter to maintain it in like condition during the course of the lease. This common law obligation has been supplemented by two statutorily imposed repairing obligations.

The first such obligation was imposed by the Housing (Scotland) Act 1925 which provided for a condition of habitability, both at the outset and throughout the lease, to be implied in certain leases. This condition was implied, whatever the lease itself might say, in leases made before 31 July 1923 at an annual rent of up to £16, raised to £26 where the lease was entered into on or after that date. (These rental limits remained unchanged until 2 January 1989 when the limit was raised by Order to £300 per week).

The above implied condition of habitability did not apply where the lease was for at least three years on terms which made the tenant responsible for making the dwelling-house habitable.

The second implied repairing obligation was introduced by the Housing (Scotland) Act 1962 and applied to leases granted on or after 3 July 1962 for a period of less than seven years. The Act imposed conditions equivalent to those under the Housing Act 1961 for England and Wales i.e. the landlord was under an obligation to keep in repair the structure and exterior of the dwelling-house; and to keep in repair and proper working order the main service installations of the house.

Over the years since their initial enactment, periodic consolidation of both Acts has taken place and both obligations are now contained in section 113 of, and Schedule 10 to, the Housing (Scotland) Act 1987.

Statutory succession

Statutory transmission on death of tenant
Until 1972 the law governing the transmission of a tenancy following the death of the tenant was embodied in the Acts with a Great Britain application and is accordingly covered in the previous section.

The Housing (Financial Provisions) (Scotland) Act 1972 made amendments equivalent to those made by the Housing Finance Act 1972, i.e. entry into a new contractual tenancy with a person who was a tenant by succession should not extend the sequence of two successions deriving from the original tenancy.

The Tenant's Rights, Etc., (Scotland) Act 1980 mirrored the reforms made by the Housing Act 1980, i.e. a surviving spouse could succeed to the tenancy provided the dwelling-house was his (or her) only or principal home when the tenant died i.e. residence with the deceased tenant was no longer a requirement.

The reforms made by the Acts of 1972 and 1980 were consolidated in the Rent (Scotland) Act 1984.

The Housing (Scotland) Act 1988 made further significant amendments to the transmission rules comparable to those made by the Housing Act 1988. A successor to a regulated tenancy does so as a statutory assured tenant; required residence by a non-spouse family successor is extended from six months to two years; and other provisions limit the succession rights of spouses and members of the tenant's family to an assured tenancy.

Disclosure of landlord's identity
The Housing Act 1974 made important changes in the general law of landlord and tenant. It required a written statement of the landlord's name and address to be provided in response to a written request by a tenant to a person demanding or receiving rent, and, in the case of a company landlord, a statement of the name and address of the secretary and every director of the landlord company.

A time limit of twenty one days was imposed on the provision of the information and it was an offence, punishable by a fine, not to comply with the written request.

The Act of 1974 also obliged a landlord to notify the tenant of the name and address of the new landlord where his landlord's interest was assigned. This should be done by the later of either:

a)   two months after the date of assignation i.e. assignment; or
b)   the first day after that date on which rent is payable.

Again, criminal liability in the form of a fine was attached to non-compliance.

The provisions in the Act of 1974 were repealed and re-enacted in sections 327 and 328 of the Housing (Scotland) Act 1987.

Protection for eviction

Protection from illegal eviction and harassment
One of the particular problems which was caused by the relaxation of earlier Rent Act controls in the 1920s and in the 1950s was that a significant number of unscrupulous landlords, with the prospect of recovering possession of their properties in sight, were tempted to hasten this process. One of the ways they did this was by charging extortionate rents, in many cases for slum property. The name of Peter Rachman is always associated with this kind of landlord practice.

Illegal Eviction

In Scotland, ever since the middle of the 16th century, the proper course for a landlord whose tenant refused to quit was to apply to the court for a warrant for his ejection under the Statute of 1555 Anent Warnings of Tenants. Ejections brevi mami and ejection in certain other circumstances gave rise to a civil claim by the tenant for damages for wrongeous ejection.

The Prevention from Eviction Act 1964 made it a criminal offence to evict any residential occupier without a court order.

Harassment

The Prevention from Eviction Act 1964 also introduced the offence of "harassment", i.e. acts calculated to cause the occupier to leave, or to refrain from exercising any right or pursuing any remedy.

Consolidation

The Rent Act 1965 replaced in amended form the provisions in the above Act of 1964. These provisions were later repealed and re-enacted in Part III of the Rent (Scotland) Act 1984.

Current Position

The Housing (Scotland) Act 1988, as amended by the Housing Act 1988,
strengthened the existing sanctions against landlords by enabling damages based on the difference between 'Vacant possession" value and "sitting tenant" value to be awarded following
illegal eviction; and by replacing, in harassment cases, the notion that actions had to be
"calculated" with that of "likely" effect, i.e. replacing the need to show intent with a test of likelihood.

The above Act of 1988 extended the protection from eviction provisions in the Rent (Scotland) Act 1984 to persons occupying premises on terms other than those of a full tenancy; but excluded from those provisions persons who share some accommodation with the owner or a member of the owner's family, and the shared accommodation is part or all of the only or principal home of the owner.

Notice to quit
The most common use of a notice to quit both north and south of the border is by a landlord to give the tenant proper and formal notice of termination of the tenancy as an essential preliminary to court proceedings for recovery of possession.

But in Scotland a further important function of proper notice to quit is to prevent tacit relocation operating in cases where, for example, one or other of the parties wishes to renew the tenancy on different terms. As tacit relocation begins to operate as soon as the final date by which valid notice to quit must be given it is therefore crucial that there are no technical defects in the notice to quit, so as to make it invalid.
 
Legal Requirements As To Length of Notice

The period of notice that, to be valid, a notice to quit served by either party must give is determined by the length and nature of the tenancy it seeks to terminate. The basic rules are prescribed by the Sheriff Courts (Scotland) Act 1907 which provides that

a)   dwelling-houses let for not more than four months require notice of one-third of the period of let; and
b)   in any other case at least forty days' notice.

In cases falling within (a) above, the "one-third" rule is subject to the minimum of twenty-eight days' notice initially introduced by the Rent Act 1957 and now embodied in section 112 of the Rent (Scotland) Act 1984.

The minimum of forty days' notice required in cases covered by (b) above is subject to section 13(2) of the Act of 1984 where the lease created a short tenancy. The tenant under such a tenancy may terminate it by giving the landlord one month's notice if the period of the tenancy is two years or less and three months' notice in any other case.

In addition to the above considerations, the Notice to quit must expire on the "ish" date:

Further modifications are made where the occupancy arrangements create a Part VII contract. Sections 71 to 76 of the Act of 1984 contain the detailed rules concerning notices to quit in Part VII contract cases, and incorporate the amendments made to the Rent (Scotland) Act 1971 by the Rent Act 1974 and by the Tenant's Rights Etc. (Scotland) Act 1980.

Legal Requirements As To Content Of A Notice To Quit

Ever since 31 March 1976, under provisions first introduced by the Housing Act 1974, in cases where the tenancy is a protected tenancy or a Part VII contract, the notice to quit has been required to be in writing and to contain the information prescribed by a series of Regulations. A corresponding obligation was introduced for assured tenancies on 2 January 1989.

The current Regulations are:-
For protected tenancies and Part VII contracts:
The Rent Regulation (Forms and Information etc.) (Scotland) Regulations 1991
For assured tenancies:
The Assured Tenancies (Notices to Quit Prescribed Information) (Scotland) Regulations 1988.

Schedule 23 to the Housing (Scotland) Act 1987 added a new section 39A to the Sheriff Courts (Scotland) Act 1907 which brought the notice to quit procedure under that Act into line with the procedure under the Rent (Scotland) Act 1984.

Legal Requirements As To service Of A Notice To Quit

The  Sheriff Courts (Scotland) Act 1907 requires that a notice to quit must be served by a Sheriff officer or recorded delivery.

Premiums
The law on prohibited premiums was, until 1980, more or less uniform north and south of the border and reference should accordingly be made to The history of rent control in England and Wales section to ascertain how the law evolved between 1915 and 1980. The only difference worthy of note prior to 1980 arises because the legislation applicable to furnished lettings was enacted three years earlier in Scotland than in England.

The Rent of Furnished Houses Control (Scotland) Act 1943 made it an offence to receive as well as to require a premium as a condition of the grant, etc., of a contract to which that Act applied and a rent had been registered for the premises in question. The equivalent legislation in England and Wales, the Furnished Houses (Rent Control) Act 1946, subsequently made similar provision south of the border.

Both the Housing Act 1980 and the Tenant's Rights, Etc. (Scotland) Act 1980 expanded the definition of "premium" to include a returnable deposit which exceeded, in effect, two months' rent. However, the Housing Act 1980 added a further condition, that the deposit also had to be reasonable in relation to the potential liability in respect of which it was paid. But the Scottish Act did not include a corresponding provision because it was not considered appropriate to have a test based on reasonableness included in a definition which, if breached, constituted a criminal offence.

The statutory provisions currently applicable to Scotland are contained in
a)  Part VIII of the Rent (Scotland) Act 1984; and
b)  Section 27 of the Housing (Scotland) Act 1988 which applies to assured tenancies the prohibitions contained in Part VIII of the Act of 1984.

There is no corresponding provision to section 27 in the Housing Act 1988

Following an extensive campaign in 2012 led by Shelter Scotland to end what it perceived as illegal premiums being charged on tenants, the Scottish Government clarified the law covering what fees letting agents and landlords can charge private tenants. With effect from November 2012 all tenant charges, other than rent and a refundable deposit, were banned in Scotland. Consultations are being held to introduce similar legislation in England and Wales during 2015.

Rent books
A requirement that the landlord should provide a rent book was first imposed by the Increase of Rent and Mortgage Interest (Restrictions) Act 1938. Under that Act the landlord was only obliged to provide a rent book where the rent was payable weekly and this remains the position today. An equivalent obligation was placed by the Rent Act 1957 upon lessors to whom the Rent of Furnished Houses Control (Scotland) Act 1943 applied.

Although a landlord need not provide a rent book (or other similar document) except where the rent is payable weekly, if he does, in fact, provide one in other cases, in common with mandatory rent books it also must provide a notice in the form prescribed by regulations.

The need for every rent book to conform to the prescribed requirements was first required by the Rent and Mortgage Interest Restrictions (Amendment) Act 1933 i.e. some five years before the need to provide a rent book was made obligatory for weekly rents. Over the years the prescribed requirements have been updated to reflect changes in the law, e.g. the disappearance of tenancies formerly covered by the Rent Acts, the introduction of new forms of tenure within those Acts, etc.

Failure to provide either a rent book or one not in accordance with the prescribed requirements is punishable by a fine. Entries in a rent book purporting to show rent arrears are likewise punishable by a fine.

The current provisions governing rent books are:-

Rent (Scotland) Act 1984	Part IV for regulated tenancies
Part VII for contracts within its scope
Housing (Scotland) Act 1988   Part II for assured tenancies.

Notices to be contained in rent books

For regulated tenancies and Part VII contracts: The Rent Regulation (Forms and Information etc.,) (Scotland) Regulations 1991 as amended by the Rent Regulation (Forms and Information etc.,) (Scotland) Amendment Regulations 1993.

For assured tenancies:

The Assured Tenancies (Rent Book) (Scotland) Regulations 1988 as amended by the Assured Tenancies (Rent Book) (Scotland) Amendment Regulations 1993.

Rent allowances

Rent allowances were introduced in Scotland by the Housing (Financial Provisions)(Scotland) Act 1972. To prevent rent allowance being paid towards excessive rents payment was made conditional upon either a fair rent having been registered or the local authority being satisfied that the contractual rent was not above a fair rent. This latter requirement led to Rent Officers being deluged with requests from local authorities for informal advice on what a fair rent was likely to be.

The Act of 1972 required local authorities to set up rent allowance schemes in respect of unfurnished houses in the private sector (including housing associations) but by the Furnished Lettings (Rent Allowances) Act 1973 certain furnished tenants in both the public and private sectors were made eligible for rent allowances.

Under both Acts the rent eligible to be met by a rent allowance was restricted to the occupational element of the rent i.e. any amounts in the rent attributable to rates, furniture, services or business use were disregarded. But furnished tenants who were "qualifying persons" under the 1973 Act were entitled to a "25 per cent mark up" on the eligible rent. Both of these provisions were repealed by the Rent Act 1974.

Landlords were required by the Act of 1972 to provide their tenants with information about the availability of rent allowances. Failure to do so was punishable by a fine of up to £50.

The introduction of the rent allowance for private sector unfurnished tenancies made it possible to speed up the conversion of the remaining controlled tenancies to rent regulation and to reduce the phasing period from four years to two years.

Rent allowances for private sector tenants and rate rebates for public sector tenants now came under the general heading of "Housing Benefit".

Housing benefit referrals

The statutory provisions enabling Rent Officers to be used to set rent levels in connection with housing benefit and housing benefit finance, for Scotland, are contained in the Housing (Scotland) Act 1988. The provisions which are permissive made consequential amendments to the Social Security Act 1986.

The criteria under which Rent Officers must operate in carrying out these additional functions are provided for in Orders made under the Act of 1988 and its English equivalent. Orders applicable to Scotland are made in parallel with those made for England and Wales. The current extant Orders are the Rent Officers (Additional Functions) (Scotland) Order 1995 and the Rent Officers (Additional Functions)(Scotland) Amendment Order 1995. (might need updating)

Consolidation of Rent Acts

It was not until 1971 that Scotland achieved the consolidation of the pre-war and post-war legislation that had taken place in 1968 in England and Wales through the Rent Act 1968.
The Rent (Scotland) Act 1971 consolidated all those enactments commonly known as the Rent Acts in their application to Scotland. In all, some fourteen Acts were wholly repealed and consolidated without amendment, together with a number of ancillary provisions which were formerly contained in Housing Acts. Only Part III of the Rent Act 1965 (protection against harassment and illegal eviction) was not re-enacted as it was of more general application.

Any hope that the Act of 1971 would form a long-lasting compendium of the law in this field was quickly shattered. The Housing (Financial Provisions) (Scotland) Act 1972, the Rent Act 1974, the Housing, Rents and Subsidies (Scotland) Act 1975 and the Tenant's Rights Etc. (Scotland) Act 1980 all changed the prevailing law quite substantially.

These important developments made another consolidation desirable and the consolidating statute, the Rent (Scotland) Act 1984, included not only the substantive provisions of the Acts listed in the previous paragraph but also Part III of the Rent Act 1965 and some minor provisions in other Acts passed since 1971.

Two other Acts have been passed since 1984: the Housing (Scotland) Act 1987 which consolidated much of the legislation dealing with housing law, and the Housing (Scotland) Act 1988 which introduced assured tenancies in Scotland and the housing benefit referral procedures involving Rent Officers.

Security of tenure

This section gives a brief outline of the development over the past eighty years of the security of tenure provisions of the Rent Acts.

Since 1915 both the provisions generally and individual provisions have been subject to considerable adaptation and amendment as different governments with different policies have extended or reduced a tenant's right to continue to occupy beyond the end of the contractual tenancy. Reference should be made to The history of rent control in England and Wales and here has been adopted just a broad approach on the following lines.

Following a general discussion of the subject, a Table of Comparisons lists under general headings the current grounds of recovery applicable to protected, secure and assured tenancies together with the original historical derivation of each of these provisions.

Reference will need to be made to the respective Acts where a detailed comparison of a particular ground is desired.

Historical Considerations

It will be recalled that after the passing of the Increase of Rent and Mortgage (Restrictions) Act 1920 all the legislation connected with rent control and security of tenure was until 1971 effected by adding to or amending existing Acts. The then prevailing security of tenure provisions were contained in the Rent and Mortgage Interest Restrictions (Amendment) Act 1933 as regards "controlled" tenancies and in the Rent Act 1965 for "regulated" tenancies. The Rent (Scotland) Act 1971 codified these provisions and has itself now been consolidated in the Rent (Scotland) Act 1984.

One significant complication in this exercise has been that in the pre-1939 legislation what are now individual cases in the Rent (Scotland) Act 1984 were not always separated out in that way. Nor, on repeal and consolidation, was the then prevailing wording invariably used. The reasons for this varied. It was sometimes the result of court judgements, sometimes to improve clarity, occasionally due to an amalgamation of existing provisions or to an extension of an existing provision to cover additional circumstances, or simply due to the whim of the draftsman!

Ever since 1915 the Rent Acts have given tenants of dwelling-houses to which they applied protection against eviction by their landlords, save on certain limited grounds. Security of tenure is an essential complement to the restrictions on increases of rent which the Acts imposed, and it is worth repeating that either form of protection on its own would be illusory.

There would be little point in protecting tenants against increases in rent beyond certain permitted limits if the landlord, by serving a notice to quit, could recover possession at the end of the contractual tenancy in accordance with the normal common law rules. Conversely, restrictions on the landlord's common law right to recover possession would benefit the tenant little if the landlord could force the tenant to leave by raising the rent to a level beyond the tenant's capacity to pay.

The security of tenure conferred by the relevant legislation is, in essence, simple. It is achieved by the Acts depriving the court of jurisdiction to grant the landlord possession save in the circumstances specified, and even in many of these prescribed circumstances the court has a discretion. It was not until the Rent Act 1965 that mandatory grounds for recovery became available to private sector landlords and then only in respect of regulated tenancies.

Types of Tenancy

There are three kinds of tenancy in Scotland which give rise to full security of tenure. These are protected and assured in the privately rented sector and secure in the public sector. These tenures exist under three separate Acts and in addition there are differences in the tests between the different tenures.

Protected Tenancies

The expression "protected tenancy", first used in the Rent Act 1965, is an inclusive term which covered both "controlled" tenancies and "regulated" tenancies. Protected tenancies (which since 1980 can only be regulated tenancies) are currently governed by the Rent (Scotland) Act 1984. Section 11 of that Act provides that there can only be an order for possession where the court is satisfied that it is reasonable to make the order and either suitable alternative accommodation is, or will be, available or one of the ten discretionary grounds specified in Part I of Schedule 2 is satisfied. Part II of the Schedule deals with the ten mandatory grounds which attract no test of reasonableness.

Assured Tenancies

These were introduced by the Housing (Scotland) Act 1988 and are now the only form of tenancy which can be provided for both the privately rented and housing association sectors. Section 18 of that Act provides that the landlord may obtain an order for possession only if he satisfies one of the grounds prescribed in Schedule 5. Part I of the Schedule lists the eight mandatory grounds and Part II details the nine discretionary grounds, with the latter grounds again being subject to the test of reasonableness.
 
Schedule 5 is similar in style to Schedule 2 to the Rent (Scotland) Act 1984 and to Schedule 3 to the Housing (Scotland) Act 1987. Many of the grounds of possession are clearly founded on traditional Rent Act precedents.

Secure Tenancies
 
Prior to 1980 neither local authority nor housing association tenants had had any right to security of tenure since 1954 when the Rent Acts were disapplied to such tenants by, for Scotland, the Housing (Repairs and Rents) (Scotland) Act 1954. However, security of tenure was restored in Scotland to these categories of tenants by the Tenant's Rights Etc., (Scotland) Act 1980 which introduced secure tenancies as a form of tenure. The security of tenure provisions have now been consolidated into the Housing (Scotland) Act 1987. Sections 46 and 48 of that Act provide that an order for possession may be granted only on the grounds laid down in Schedule 3. Part I of the Schedule sets out the sixteen grounds, all of which are discretionary. There are no mandatory grounds as such.

The grounds of possession are analogous to those available to private sector landlords under Schedule 2 to the Rent (Scotland) Act 1984 but there are important differences which reflect the different roles and responsibilities of public and private sector landlords.

Grounds 1 to 7 are "conduct" grounds with the court having also to be satisfied that it is reasonable to grant an order for possession.

Grounds 8 to 15 are "management" grounds with the landlord having also to establish that suitable accommodation is, or will be, available. If this is done the court has no discretion to refuse the order.

In addition to the grounds of recovery specified above the Act of 1987 also provides, in sections 49 to 51, for recovery of possession where the secure tenancy appears to have been abandoned.

General Notes

With the introduction of assured tenancies from 2 January 1989, since that date it has no longer been possible to create new protected tenancies apart from in the circumstances covered by the transitional and exceptional provisions listed in Section 42 of the Housing (Scotland) Act 1988.

The Housing (Scotland) Act 1988 provided that all new tenancies created
in the housing association sector from 2 January 1989 would be assured tenancies but that those created before that date would continue as secure tenancies for those particular tenants.

Table of derivations

The following abbreviations are used in the Table of Comparisons to show the main historical derivation of the security of tenure provisions listed therein.
1915 = Increase of Rent and Mortgage Interest (War Restrictions) Act 1915

1919 = Increase of Rent, Etc., (Amendment) Act 1919

1920 = Increase of Rent and Mortgage Interest (Restrictions) Act 1920

1923 = Rent and Mortgage Interest Restrictions Act 1923

1923 = Prevention of Eviction Act 1924

1933 = Rent and Mortgage Interest Restrictions (Amendment) Act 1933

1965 = Rent Act 1965

1967 = Agriculture Act 1967

1970 = Agriculture Act 1970

1974 = Rent Act 1974

1980 = Tenant's Rights, Etc., (Scotland) Act 1980

1986 = Housing (Scotland) Act 1986

1988 = Housing (Scotland) Act 1988

NOTES TO THE TABLE OF COMPARISONS

Reasonable to make an order

The first reference to the test of reasonableness was in the Act of 1919 when it was restricted to being a factor to be considered in cases where the tenanted house was required by the landlord etc. The Act of 1920 made the condition of reasonableness generally applicable, thus making all the grounds of recovery, in effect, discretionary. This long-standing principle of "reasonableness" was also extended to the discretionary ground of recovery applicable to secure and assured tenancies.

The current statutory references are:

Protected tenancies	section 11(1) of the Rent (Scotland) Act 1984.

Secure tenancies	section 48(2)(a) of the Housing (Scotland) Act 1987

Assured tenancies	section 18(4) of the Housing (Scotland) Act 1988
S
Suitable alternative accommodation

The existence of "suitable alternative accommodation" as a ground on which the court can give possession (always provided that the condition of reasonableness is met) has figured in the Rent Acts ever since the Act of 1919 but the surrounding language has varied from time to time. The availability of "alternative accommodation" was originally tightly tied to the discretionary ground, as enacted in that Act, relating to the landlord reasonably requiring the tenanted house for himself, etc. The test as regards the suitability of the alternative accommodation was made in comparison with that house.

The Act of 1923 retained the link identified above but changed the test to a comparison with the means and needs of the tenant and his family. It was not until the Act of 1933 that the availability of "suitable alternative accommodation" became a free-standing ground in its own right on which a landlord could initiate court proceedings for recovery of possession.

The definition of what constituted "suitable alternative accommodation" was also subject to considerable amendment. The court was given no guidance by the Act of 1919 which referred simply to the "alternative accommodation available" as being one of the circumstances which would influence the decision as to the reasonableness of making the order.

In the Act of 1920 the "alternative accommodation" had to be "reasonably equivalent as regards rent and suitability in all respects".

The Act of 1923 which had changed the "comparison" test also amplified what constituted "suitable" to include a requirement that the alternative accommodation provided equivalent security of tenure. The assurance that the housing authority would re-house the deposed tenant was to be regarded as conclusive evidence as to suitable alternative accommodation being available, was introduced by the Act of 1933.

The current statutory references are:

  Protected tenancies  Part IV of Schedule 2 to the Rent (Scotland) Act 1984
 
  Secure tenancies     section 48(2)(b) or (c) of, and Part II of Schedule 3 to,                          to the Housing (Scotland) Act 1987
 
  Assured tenancies    Ground 9 in Part II of, and Part II of, Schedule 5 to the Housing                      Housing (Scotland) Act 1988

Greater hardship test

This test was first introduced by the Act of 1924 and then as now was/is only relevant in cases where the tenanted house is required by the landlord, etc. The current statutory reference is Part III of Schedule 2 to the Rent (Scotland) Act 1984.

Security of Tenure

Table of comparisons

See also
 Tenancy deposit schemes (Scotland)

References 

Scots property law
Housing in Scotland
Affordable housing
Britain
Regulation in the United Kingdom